Felipe Sanchón Huerta (born 8 April 1982) is a Spanish professional footballer who plays as an attacking midfielder.

He played 199 Segunda División games over nine seasons, totalling 43 goals for Girona (six years), Granada, Gimnàstic and Hércules (one apiece).

Club career
Born in Barcelona, Catalonia, Sanchón started his career at the age of 10, in FC Barcelona's youth system. Between 2001 and 2004 he represented the club's C and B teams and, during this period, he was capped by Spain at youth level.

Unable to carve a niche with the main squad Sanchón was released, going on to play for Barça neighbours UE Figueres, Girona FC and CE L'Hospitalet. His first taste of top-flight football arrived when he signed for Thessaloniki-based Aris F.C. in July 2007.

In 2009's January transfer window, Sanchón returned to Spain and Girona on a loan until the end of the season. On 11 January, in a Segunda División home game against SD Eibar, he scored in a 2–0 win in his first appearance, netting six times in only 17 matches as the side managed to retain their league status.

On 28 July 2009, Sanchón joined Granada CF, loaned by Udinese Calcio alongside eight other players after the two clubs' partnership agreement. He contributed 35 games and four goals as the Andalusia team returned to the second tier after an absence of 22 years, but in late January 2011 left for another club in that league, Gimnàstic de Tarragona, still owned by the Italians.

References

External links

1982 births
Living people
Spanish footballers
Footballers from Barcelona
Association football midfielders
Segunda División players
Segunda División B players
Tercera División players
FC Barcelona C players
FC Barcelona Atlètic players
UE Figueres footballers
Girona FC players
CE L'Hospitalet players
Granada CF footballers
Gimnàstic de Tarragona footballers
Hércules CF players
CE Sabadell FC footballers
Super League Greece players
Aris Thessaloniki F.C. players
Udinese Calcio players
Spanish expatriate footballers
Expatriate footballers in Greece
Spanish expatriate sportspeople in Greece